Francesca Michielin (born 25 February 1995) is an Italian singer and songwriter. She rose to fame after winning the fifth season of the Italian talent show X Factor. Her first single, "Distratto", debuted atop the Italian FIMI Top Digital Downloads chart and was certified double platinum by the Federation of the Italian Music Industry. Michielin's debut studio album, Riflessi di me, was released in October 2012, preceded by the single "Sola".

During the following years, she released the albums di20 (2015) and 2640 (2018), both certified gold by the Federation of the Italian Music Industry, and several hit singles, including "L'amore esiste" (2015), "Nessun grado di separazione" (2016), "Vulcano" (2018), "Io non abito al mare" (2018) and "Cheyenne" (2019). 

She recorded three commercially successful singles with Italian rapper Fedez—"Cigno nero" (2013), "Magnifico" (2014) and "Chiamami per nome" (2021)—and she released collaborations with several artists spanning different genres, including rappers Fabri Fibra and Don Joe, indie pop acts Giorgio Poi, Coma Cose, Vasco Brondi and Carl Brave, rock band Måneskin, and pop singers Elisa and Max Gazzè. Her fourth studio album, Feat (stato di natura), was conceived as a collection of previously unreleased collaborations.

During her career, Michielin competed twice in the Sanremo Music Festival, placing second both in 2016 with "Nessun grado di separazione" and in 2021 with "Chiamami per nome", performed with Fedez. With "Nessun grado di separazione", she went on representing Italy in the Eurovision Song Contest 2016.

As a novelist, she released the book Il cuore è un organo in 2022. During the same year, she debuted as a record producer on a track of the album Caos by Fabri Fibra, and as a television presenter, hosting the docuseries Effetto serra and the upcoming sixteenth season of X Factor.

Early life
Michielin was born in Bassano del Grappa, to Vanna Moro and Tiziano Michielin. She has an older brother, Filippo. Her first experience with playing music came from studying piano, when she was 9-years-old. She later started studying electric bass. At the age of fourteen, she started singing in her hometown's gospel choir. Thanks to her brother, she developed an interest in rock music, and she later focused on artists like Bon Iver, Jeff Buckley and Damien Rice.
After listening to Adele's debut album 19, Michielin started writing her own songs on piano. During high school, she also founded a three-pieces punk rock girl band, named Monkey Nuts, in which she played bass.

Before rising to fame, she was a student at the third year of the liceo classico Brocchi in Bassano del Grappa. Starting from the school's fourth year, she only took exams as an external candidate, in order to continue pursuing her musical career. In July 2014, she obtained the maturity diploma at the Cavanis institute in Possagno. In March 2022, she was graduated in jazz singing with honours at the Conservatory  Agostino Steffani in Castelfranco Veneto.

Career

2011–2012: X Factor and Riflessi di me

When she was sixteen, she was asked to replace a soloist singer in a gospel concert. Her performance impressed a sound technician, who decided to register her for the auditions for the fifth series of X Factor, in 2011. She sang Led Zeppelin's "Whole Lotta Love", and she was chosen by her mentor Simona Ventura to be part of her team. During the live shows, she performed songs including Adele's "Someone Like You", "Roadhouse Blues" by The Doors, and Stevie Wonder's "Higher Ground".

On 29 December 2011, during the semifinal, Michielin premiered the song "Distratto", written by Elisa and Roberto Casalino. In the final on 5 January 2012, she was announced as the winner, beating runner up vocal group I Moderni. With her victory, she won a recording contract with Sony Music, with a stated value of €300,000.

Her debut single "Distratto" was released as a digital download EP on 6 January 2012. On 12 January 2012, the song debuted at number one on the Italian Singles Chart, and it was later certified double platinum by the Federation of the Italian Music Industry, for domestic downloads exceeding 60,000 units.
The song was included in Michielin's debut EP, Distratto, which was released on 24 January 2012. The EP includes re-recorded versions of some of the songs she performed during the live shows. On 17 February 2012, Michielin appeared as a guest during the fourth night of the 62nd Sanremo Music Festival, performing the song "Al posto del mondo" with contestant Chiara Civello.

Michielin's second single, "Sola", was released on 31 August 2012. The single preceded her debut studio album, Riflessi di me, featuring collaborations with producer Andrea Rigonat and singer-songwriters Elisa and Roberto Casalino. Michielin has writing credits on three songs on the album, including the title-track, co-written with Elisa and Virginio Simonelli. Riflessi di me later spawned the singles "Tutto quello che ho" and "Se cadrai".

2013–2014: Collaborations and "Amazing"
In March 2013, Michielin was featured on the song "Cigno nero" by Italian rapper Fedez. The song, co-written by Michielin herself, was included in Fedez's album Sig. Brainwash − L'arte di accontentare and was released as its second single.

In 2014, Michielin took part in the theatrical performance La ragazza con l'orecchino di perla, with music written by Franco Battiato. The show was held at Teatro Comunale di Bologna on 19 and 20 January 2014.
On 28 March of the same year, Michielin released a new single, "Amazing". The song, entirely composed in English, was written by Michielin with Fausto Cogliati and Negin Djafari for the Italian version of the soundtrack of The Amazing Spider-Man 2.

In 2014, Michielin appeared on Fedez's track "Magnifico" for his album Pop-Hoolista. After being released as the album's second single, the song reached the top spot of the Italian singles chart, and it was certified triple platinum in Italy.

2015–2016: di20, Sanremo Music Festival and Eurovision Song Contest

In April 2014, Michielin confirmed she was working on new material. The single "L'amore esiste", produced by Fortunato Zampaglione and Michele Canova, was released on 6 March 2015, ahead of her second studio album, di20. The song achieved commercial success, entering the top ten of the Italian FIMI Top Digital chart, and receiving the Lunezia Pop Award.
"L'amore esiste" was followed by "Battito di ciglia", released on 10 July 2015, and "Lontano", released on 25 September 2015. 
To launch di20, Michielin performed at the Unicredit Pavilion in Milan on 21 October 2015, four days before the official release of the album.

In January 2016, Michielin also embarked on her first concert tour, titled Nice to Meet You. A live extended play was recorded during the show and released exclusively to digital stores on 30 January 2016.
In February 2016, she competed in the 66th Sanremo Music Festival, performing the song "Nessun grado di separazione". The song placed second in the competition, behind Stadio's "Un giorno mi dirai". The band was then eligible to represent Italy in the Eurovision Song Contest 2016, but they declined, stating they would be on a previously planned tour in May 2016. Their decision led RAI to select Michielin as the Italian entry for the 61st edition of the European competition. 
Michielin's entry was a new version of "Nessun grado di separazione", featuring an English-language chorus and titled "No Degree of Separation". In the final she placed 16th out of 26.
"Nessun grado di separazione" debuted atop the Italian singles chart and was included in di20are, a new edition of Michielin's second studio album.

On 3 June 2016, "Un cuore in due" was released as the album's fifth single. The music video was directed by Giacomo Triglia and was released on 13 June 2016.

On 23 September 2016, "Almeno tu" was released as the album's sixth and final single. It was also included in the soundtrack of Piuma. A music video featuring Michielin as well as segments from the film was released on 24 September 2016.

2017–2018: 2640
In January 2017, Michielin announced through her Twitter account that she had started working in the studio on her third album, the title of which was later announced as 2640. The album was recorded in Los Angeles with producer Michele Canova. 
The album's lead single "Vulcano" was released on 21 July 2017, along with a music video directed by Giacomo Triglia and filmed between 10pm and 5:30am in Berlin. The song achieved a platinum certification in Italy.
On 1 October 2017, Michielin performed "Vulcano" on Che tempo che fa and announced the album's release date as 12 January 2018. The album was made available to pre-order on 22 December 2017, with the song "Tropicale" as a pre-order bonus.

"Io non abito al mare" was released as the album's second single on 17 November 2017. Its music video, filmed at Cretto di Burri, was directed by Giacomo Triglia and released on 20 November 2017. Lyrically, the song speaks of the difficulty of communicating, the difference between feeling and listening and the desire to embrace, not to be afraid of showing that side of feeling that is pure tenderness. The song achieved a platinum certification in Italy.

"Bolivia" was released as the third single from the album on 16 March 2018. The music video was released on 20 March 2018. It was directed by Giacomo Triglia and the screenplay was written by Francesca Michielin. In an interview with Rolling Stone, Michielin said that the song is a criticism of people who chase change and run away to exotic and remote places with the idea of living a more genuine life and making a difference, without realising that the problem to be solved is often within them.

"Tropicale" was released as the fourth single on 15 June 2018, along with a music video.
In May 2018, Michielin also provided featured vocals, together with rapper Fabri Fibra, on the single "Fotografia" by Italian recording artist Carl Brave.
On 16 November 2018, Michielin released a new song, "Femme", written by Michielin and Calcutta and remixed by Bruno Belissimo. A vinyl edition of 2640 was released on 7 December 2018, including the original 13 tracks as well as "Femme", "Fotografia" and the demo of "Tropicale".

Michielin composed the original soundtrack for the short film A Cup of Coffee with Marylin, which was directed by Alessandra Gonnella and which premiered at the 2019 Cannes Film Festival.

2019–2021: Feat (Stato di natura) 
Michelin began teasing her musical return on her social media accounts on 8 November 2019, culminating in the announcement of the single "Cheyenne" featuring Charlie Charles, which was released on 15 November 2019 as the lead single from Michielin's fourth studio album.  
Titled Feat (stato di natura) and released on 13 March 2020, the album included 11 tracks, all of which featured other artists, with the main theme being the contrast and union between urban and natural environments. It was set to be preceded by three concerts, each with a different location, theme and arrangement. A new song from the album was premiered during each event, and released on the following day—"Gange", featuring Italian rapper Shiva, was released after the performance which took place at the Rocket nightclub on 20 February 2020; "Riserva naturale", featuring Coma Cose, premiered on 27 February 2020 during a show which was set to take place at the Serraglio nightclub, but was turned to a Facebook livestream session due to restrictions aimed at containing the outbreak of the COVID-19 pandemic in Italy.
 "Monolocale", featuring Fabri Fibra, debuted at the 5 March 2020 event, broadcast on RaiPlay.
The album debuted and peaked at number 7 in Italy. The song "Stato di natura", featuring Måneskin, was released as the album's second single on 13 March 2020. On 3 April 2020, "Monolocale" was released as the album's third single. 

In the meanwhile, Michielin performed a cover of Gianni Morandi, Enrico Ruggeri & Umberto Tozzi's "Si può dare di più" with Levante and Maria Antonietta for the third night of the 70th Sanremo Music Festival, on 6 February 2020. She was among the artists involved in the charity event Musica che unisce, created as a collage of home made contributions and performances recorded and broadcast during the COVID-19 lockdown, and she performed "Cheyenne" from a panoramic corner in her hometown Bassano del Grappa during the 2020 International Worker's Day concert, annually supported by Italian trade unions CGIL, CISL and UIL and adapted in 2020 to a televised show without any audience.

On 22 January 2021, Michielin released the song "Cattive stelle" with Vasco Brondi, as an addition to her previous album Feat (stato di natura). 
In February of the same year, she launched her podcast titled Maschiacci – Per cosa lottano le donne oggi?, interviewing celebrities about topics related to the fight against gender stereotypes. 
In March 2021, she performed the song "Chiamami per nome" with Fedez at the 71st Sanremo Music Festival.
After being the bookmaker's favourite to be victorious in the contest, it placed second overall.
This marked the pair's third collaboration, following 2013's "Cigno nero" and 2014's "Magnifico". The song reached number one in Italy. 
Michielin also dueted with Samuel on the single "Cinema", and later recorded the song "Nei tuoi occhi" for the soundtrack of the film Marilyn ha gli occhi neri.

2022: Debut novel and hosting debut
Michielin was the orchestra conductor at the Sanremo Music Festival 2022 during Emma Marrone's performances of her entry "Ogni volta è così", and she dueted with her on a cover version of "...Baby One More Time". 
Shortly after, Michielin graduated in Jazz Singing at the Conservatorio Agostino Steffani in Castelfranco Veneto.
In mid-2021, she also started working on Effetto serra, a TV programme for Sky Nature, interviewing experts about sustainable individual behaviours. Her debut novel, titled Il cuore è un organo, was published on 15 March 2022 by Mondadori.

In March 2022, Michielin debuted as a record producer on the track "Liberi", included on the album Caos by Italian rapper Fabri Fibra. The track also features Michielin's vocals.
Her singles "Bonsoir", a pop song produced by Dario Faini, and "Occhi grandi grandi", a track influenced by rock and nu metal, were released on 1 July 2022 and on 9 September 2022, respectively.

In Fall 2022 Michielin returned at X Factor, replacing Ludovico Tersigni as the host of the sixteenth series of the show. In the meanwhile, she started a series of six live shows at a small venue in Milan, the Mosso. A tour celebrating the first ten years of Michielin's career, named Bonsoir! – Michielin10, is planned to take place in Italian theatres between February 2023 and April 2023.

Discography

 Riflessi di me (2012)
 di20 (2015)
 2640 (2018)
 Feat (stato di natura) (2020)
 Cani sciolti (2023)

Awards and nominations

Filmography

References

External links

 Francesca Michielin at AllMusic
 Francesca Michielin discography at Discogs
 Francesca Michielin at Musicbrainz
 

1995 births
21st-century Italian singers
Italian pop singers
Living people
The X Factor winners
X Factor (Italian TV series) contestants
People from Bassano del Grappa
Eurovision Song Contest entrants for Italy
Eurovision Song Contest entrants of 2016
21st-century Italian women singers
Italian women novelists
21st-century Italian novelists
Italian women record producers
Italian television presenters